Katni Murwara railway station  (Station Code: KMZ) is a railway station in Katni and part of the West Central Railway under  division.

Lines
It is on the Bina–Katni rail route and connects to Allahabad–Jabalpur section of Howrah–Allahabad–Mumbai line, Katni–Bilaspur line and Katni–Billibari link.

See also

References

Jabalpur railway division
Railway stations in Katni district